Cheshmeh Shahrokh Masgareh (also Romanized as Cheshmeh Shāhrokh Masgareh; also known as Cheshmeh Shāhrokh) is a village in Osmanvand Rural District, Firuzabad District, Kermanshah County, Kermanshah Province, Iran. At the 2006 census, its population was 86, in 19 families.

References 

Populated places in Kermanshah County